Working Group may refer to:

Working group, an interdisciplinary group of researchers; or
Working Group (dogs), kennel club designation for certain purebred dog breeds; or
The Working Group, an underground resistance group in the Slovak State which rescued Jews from the Holocaust

See also
The WORK Group, a pseudonym used in reference to the defunct record label known as Work Records